Birchgrove Park is an urban park and sports ground located in Birchgrove, Inner West Council, Sydney, New South Wales, Australia, on the waterfront of Sydney Harbour. It is also the location of Birchgrove Oval, the headquarters of the Sydney Cricket Club from 1897 to 1947 and a historic rugby league football ground which served as the original home of the Balmain Tigers club.

History
The park was established in 1881 through subdivision of the estate of Lieutenant John Birch, acquired by Didier Numa Joubert. Sale of Joubert's allotments fell well short of expectations, and the Bank of New South Wales foreclosed. The NSW Government acquired thirty six allotments that led to the formation of the Birchgrove Recreation Ground; and the creation of the subsequent Birchgrove Park Trust.

Regarded as the spiritual birthplace of rugby league in Australia because it hosted the first professional matches in 1908, Birchgrove Oval hosted the official launch of the 2008 NRL season, which celebrated the sport's centenary in Australia. Australian rules football also has historical links to Birchgrove Park, with NSWFA matches played there from 1903 to 1926.

During the 1908 New Zealand Māori rugby league tour of Australia, a Sydney Metropolitan team hosted a match against the tourists at Birchgrove Park. The Balmain rugby league club played Premiership matches at the ground from their first season in 1908 until 1942.

See also

 List of parks in Sydney

References

External links

 

Sports venues in Sydney
Parks in Sydney
Balmain Tigers
Rugby league stadiums in Australia
Cricket grounds in Australia
Birchgrove, New South Wales
1881 establishments in Australia
Parks established in 1881